An Evening with Fleetwood Mac was a concert tour by British-American rock band Fleetwood Mac. The tour's lineup consisted of Stevie Nicks, Christine McVie, Mick Fleetwood, John McVie, Mike Campbell and Neil Finn. The tour marked the first tour with the band for Campbell and Finn, the first tour without Lindsey Buckingham since the Another Link in the Chain Tour (1994–1995), and their final tour with Christine McVie prior to her 2022 death. The tour began on October 3, 2018, at the BOK Center in Tulsa, Oklahoma, and concluded in November 2019.

Background
Fleetwood Mac's plans for a worldwide concert tour in 2018 were first revealed by Christine McVie in March 2017, when the tour was initially referred to as a "farewell tour", with plans of having the Rumours lineup (Lindsey Buckingham, Stevie Nicks, Christine McVie, Mick Fleetwood and John McVie) reuniting for another tour for the first time since On with the Show (2014–2015). "The 2018 tour is supposed to be a farewell tour, but you take farewell tours one at a time. Somehow we always come together, this unit. We can feel it ourselves" said Christine McVie. She told The One Show in June 2017 that the band planned to begin rehearsing in March 2018, and begin the global tour in June. The band announced the tour on April 25, 2018, with a leg of 54 concerts across North America, beginning in October 2018. Weeks prior to the tour announcement, the band had announced its separation from longtime vocalist and lead guitarist Lindsey Buckingham. The separation was reportedly due to disagreements concerning the tour. According to Stevie Nicks, the band wanted to begin rehearsals in June 2018 and tour at the end of the year, while Buckingham wanted to put off rehearsals until November 2019. Vocalist/guitarist Neil Finn and guitarist Mike Campbell joined the band after Buckingham's departure.

Set list
This set list is representative of the show on March 11, 2019. It may not represent all concerts for the duration of the tour.

"The Chain"
"Little Lies"
"Dreams"
"Second Hand News"
"Say You Love Me"
"Black Magic Woman"
"Everywhere"
"Rhiannon"
"Tell Me All the Things You Do"
"World Turning"
"Gypsy"
"Oh Well"
"Don't Dream It's Over"
"Landslide"
"Hold Me"
"Monday Morning"
"You Make Loving Fun"
"Gold Dust Woman"
"Go Your Own Way"
Encore
"Free Fallin'"
"Don't Stop"
"All Over Again"
"Storms", "Hypnotized", and "Isn't It Midnight" were performed early in the tour.

Setlist 2
Setlist 2, used later in the tour, made the following changes:
"Black Magic Woman" and "Everywhere" swapped places.
"Tell Me All The Things You Do" was replaced with "I Got You".
"Monday Morning" was replaced with "Man of the World".
"All Over Again" was dropped entirely.
 “Blue Letter” was performed only in Perth, Australia.

Tour dates

Personnel
Mick Fleetwood – drums, percussion
John McVie – bass guitar
Christine McVie – vocals, keyboards, maracas on "Everywhere" and "World Turning"
Stevie Nicks – vocals, tambourine
Mike Campbell – lead guitar, Marxophone on "Gypsy", vocal on “Oh Well”
Neil Finn – vocals, rhythm guitar, lead guitar on "Don't Dream It's Over", keyboards on "All Over Again"

with:
Neale Heywood – rhythm guitar, lead guitar on "Landslide", backing vocals
Sharon Celani – backing vocals
Marilyn Martin – backing vocals
Taku Hirano – percussion
Ricky Peterson – keyboards, backing vocals

Notes

References 

2018 concert tours
2019 concert tours
Fleetwood Mac concert tours